Rozalia Yakovlevna Vynnychenko (née: Lifshits (Ukrainian: Ліфшиць); 26 July 1886 – 6 February 1959) was a spouse of Ukrainian political leader Volodymyr Vynnychenko.

Born to a Russian Jewish family in Oryol, Russia, in 1909 Lifshits graduated from the Medical faculty of Sorbonne University.

In 1909 Vynnychenko met with Rozalia in Cavi di Lavagna visiting the Russian philosopher Boris Yakovenko who was married to Rozalia's sister Vera.

See also
 First Lady of Ukraine

References

External links
 Myronets, N. Nadia Myronets: Epistolary dialogue of Volodymyr Vynnychenko with Rozalia Lifshits (1911-18). Slovo i Chas.

1886 births
1959 deaths
People from Oryol
People from Orlovsky Uyezd (Oryol Governorate)
Russian Jews
Ukrainian people of Jewish descent
First Ladies of Ukraine
Ukrainian emigrants to France
French people of Russian-Jewish descent
University of Paris alumni